Felimare cantabrica is a species of colourful sea slug or dorid nudibranch, a marine gastropod mollusc in the family Chromodorididae.

Distribution
This nudibranch is found in the Eastern Atlantic Ocean (Bay of Biscay) and the Atlantic coasts of Spain and Portugal.

Description
Felimare cantabrica has a light and dark blue body, flecked with yellow lines and spots. Its mantle edge is lined with yellow-light blue-yellow banding. The gills and rhinophores are purple.

This species can reach a total length of at least 40 mm and has been observed feeding on sponges from the genus Dysidea.

References

Chromodorididae
Gastropods described in 1980